Hit the Floor is an American drama television series created by James LaRosa. The series chronicles the off-the-court drama surrounding the Los Angeles Devils, a fictional professional basketball team. Hit the Floor debuted on VH1 on May 27, 2013. After three seasons on VH1, Hit the Floor moved to BET for season four. The series was canceled on December 7, 2018.

Series overview

Episodes

Season 1 (2013)

Season 2 (2014)

Season 3 (2016)

Special (2016)

Season 4 (2018)

References

External links
 
 

Hit the Floor